Rabbit Valley is a valley located in northwestern Mesa County, Colorado, United States. The area is generally used for paleontology, camping, hiking, mountain biking, off-road vehicle recreation, and hunting.  Rabbit Valley is accessed by Interstate 70/U.S. Route 6/U.S. Route 50.

References

External links

 Colorado Parks and Wildlife Rabbit Valley

Protected areas of Mesa County, Colorado
Valleys of Colorado
Bureau of Land Management areas in Colorado
Landforms of Mesa County, Colorado